Roger George Kennedy (August 3, 1926 – September 30, 2011) was an American polymath whose career included banking, television production, historical writing, and museum administration, the last as director of the Smithsonian Institution's National Museum of American History, before the Bill Clinton administration selected him to head the National Park Service in 1993. He was especially concerned about expanding the service's educational role and moved to enlarge its presence beyond the parks via the Internet.

Life and career
Kennedy graduated from the University of Minnesota Law School in 1952. He unsuccessfully ran for Congress in 1952 as a Republican, later becoming a Democrat. In 1953, he moved to Washington, D.C. where he worked as a civil trial lawyer with the Department of Justice and served as special assistant to the U.S. Attorney General and to the secretaries of the Department of Labor and the Department of Health, Education, and Welfare. He rose to national notice in 1955 as a news correspondent covering the Supreme Court and the White House for NBC, for which he also wrote and produced television documentaries and hosted a radio program.

Returning to Minnesota in the 1960s, Kennedy worked as a bank chairman in St. Paul and then as vice president for investments for the University of Minnesota, along with being a founder of the Guthrie Theater in Minneapolis. In 1969 the Ford Foundation brought him on as vice president for finance.

The Clinton administration appointed him as Director of the National Park Service in 1993. During his tenure, the NPS restructured its field operations and sharply reduced its central office staffs as part of a government-wide effort to downsize the federal bureaucracy. Kennedy resigned at the end of President Clinton's first term in 1997.

He was married to Frances Kennedy.

He died from melanoma on September 30, 2011, at the age of 85.

He published a favorable study of Aaron Burr--arguing he had a better character than Thomas Jefferson. Burr, Hamilton, and Jefferson: A Study in Character 2000 Oxford University Press.

Suggested Reading
"The Human Element" 2001 The George Wright Society. All rights reserved. First published in THE GEORGE WRIGHT FORUM, Volume 18, No. 2.

References

External links
 National Park Service Biography

Booknotes interview with Kennedy on Orders From France, July 9, 1989.

1926 births
2011 deaths
Directors of the National Park Service
People from Saint Paul, Minnesota
Deaths from melanoma
Deaths from cancer in Maryland
University of Minnesota Law School alumni
Lawyers from Washington, D.C.
20th-century American lawyers